Marian Bergeron (May 3, 1918 – October 22, 2002) was Miss America in 1933. She went on to a career in big-band singing and public speaking. She was a major supporter of the Miss America Pageant.

Bergeron, from West Haven, Connecticut, won the crown as the pageant returned to Atlantic City, New Jersey after a five-year hiatus. She held the title for two years since no competition was held in 1934. One of the sponsors of the pageant, RKO Pictures, refused to award Bergeron the prize of a screen test, claiming that she was too young.

Bergeron went on to a career in big-band singing. She was already an established singer at the time of the pageant, having started at the age of twelve. She appeared with several bands, among them Rudy Vallee and Guy Lombardo.  She later became a public speaker.

Bergeron was married three times. Her first marriage, to Donald Ruhlman, lasted until his death in 1972 and produced three children. Her final marriage, to Frederick Setzer, lasted until his death in March 2002.

Bergeron died of leukemia in Ohio in 2002. As of 2021, she remains the only Miss America from New England.

References 

1918 births
2002 deaths
People from West Haven, Connecticut
Deaths from leukemia
Miss America 1930s delegates
Miss America winners
Deaths from cancer in Ohio